Stryi City Stadium "Sokil" is a multi-use stadium in Stryi, Ukraine. 

It is currently used mostly for football matches, and is the home of FC Skala Stryi (2004). The stadium holds 6,000 people.

References

External links
 Sokil Stadium. Hazovyk-Skala Stryi fan website.

Football venues in Lviv Oblast
Sport in Stryi